A Crime in Paradise is a 2001 French comedy film directed by Jean Becker, adapted by Sebastien Japrisot from the story by Sacha Guitry, and starring Jacques Villeret and Josiane Balasko. The scenario was used on the film La Poison (1951).

Plot
1980, in a rural village in the Lyon region, Saint-Julien-sur-Bibost. Joseph Poacher ("Jojo") and his wife Lucienne ("Lulu"), a nagging shrew and inveterate alcoholic, lead a married life for the less confrontational, in their farm located in a place called "Paradise". One day, Jojo watches a story on television about a brilliant lawyer who has just achieved his twenty-fifth acquittal. Very impressed, Jojo will seeks the lawyer out. He tells her he killed his wife even though he hasn't actually yet done so. By a set of very clever questions, is explaining how he would have had to make to be pretty sure to get the extenuating circumstances. Jojo in then returns to "Paradise" and begins to organize, as directed by the lawyer, the staging of the "perfect crime".

Cast 

 Jacques Villeret as Jojo Braconnier
 Josiane Balasko as Lulu Braconnier
 André Dussollier as Lawyer Jacquard
 Suzanne Flon as Mistress
 Gérard Hernandez as Jacky
 Roland Magdane as The coffee's owner
 Valérie Mairesse as Magali
 Jacques Dacqmine as President Laborde
 Dominique Lavanant as Mlle Goudilleux
 Jean Dell as Judge Frégard
 Daniel Prévost as Lawyer Miramont
 Jenny Clève as Madame Bertrand
 Cécile Vassort as Madame Ramirez
 Eric Bougnon as Briscot
 Jean-Michel Martial as Jacky Lévêque
 Roger Crouzet as Mr. Doucet
 Christine Delaroche as Jacquard's assistant
 Maryse Deol as The dealer in notions
 Armand Chagot as Officer of police station
 Michel Bonnet as The substitute

References

External links 
 
 

2001 films
French comedy-drama films
2001 comedy-drama films
2000s French-language films
Films based on works by Sacha Guitry
Films directed by Jean Becker
Films set in 1980
Remakes of French films
2000s French films